The Sardinata tree frog (Hyloscirtus callipeza) is a species of frogs in the family Hylidae endemic to Colombia. Its natural habitats are subtropical or tropical moist montane forests, rivers, pastureland, plantations, rural gardens, and heavily degraded former forests.  Scientists have seen it between 1050 and 3000 meters above sea level.
It is threatened by habitat loss.

References

Hyloscirtus
Amphibians of Colombia
Amphibians of the Andes
Frogs of South America
Amphibians described in 1989
Taxonomy articles created by Polbot